Robert Gerard Kerin (born 4 January 1954) is a former South Australian politician who was the Premier of South Australia from 22 October 2001 to 5 March 2002, representing the South Australian Division of the Liberal Party of Australia. He was also Deputy Premier of South Australia from 7 July 1998 until he became Premier and, after losing government, leader of the opposition until after the 2006 election.

Early life
Born to parents Maurice and Molly Kerin in Crystal Brook, Kerin attended the Adelaide Catholic secondary school, Sacred Heart College Senior.

Parliament
Kerin was elected to parliament in 1993 as the member for the mid-north rural electoral district of Frome. Between 1995 and 2001 he held various ministries in the Brown and Olsen governments: Primary Industries, Natural Resources and Regional Development, Minerals and Energy, State Development, Tourism and Multicultural Affairs.  Following the resignation of Deputy Premier Graham Ingerson in 1998, Kerin succeeded him.

Premier
Olsen was forced to resign from the premiership after misleading parliament which would come to be known as the Motorola affair. Kerin narrowly defeated former premier Dean Brown to become Liberal leader and premier. Brown was given the role of deputy premier.

Kerin took office less than six months before the 2002 election. At that election, Labor took two seats from the Liberals, one seat short of victory.  The result was another hung parliament. While Labor was now only one seat short of a majority as opposed to the Liberals now four seats short of a majority, the Liberals won 50.9 percent of the two-party vote. The balance of power rested with four conservative crossbenchers—one National and three independents. They were initially expected to support the Liberals, allowing Kerin to stay in office with a minority government.

However, in a surprise move, Peter Lewis, who had since been elected as an independent after being expelled from the Liberals in 2000, announced that he and his fellow crossbenchers would support the ALP and its leader Mike Rann to form minority government; in return, Lewis himself wanted to be made Speaker of the House of Assembly. When Kerin learned this, he argued that the Liberals still had a mandate to govern since they had won a majority of the two-party vote. He intended to stay in office unless Rann demonstrated he had a working majority on the floor of the Assembly. On paper, Kerin was well within his rights to take this course of action; convention in the Westminster system gives the incumbent first minister the first opportunity to form a government when no party has a clear majority.

Three weeks of political limbo ended on 5 March. At Kerin's request, the House of Assembly was called into session earlier than is normally the case after an election.  With Lewis in the speaker's chair, Kerin moved a confidence motion in his own government. The motion was defeated, leaving Kerin with no choice but to resign in favour of Rann.

Opposition leader
Kerin remained Liberal leader, and hence became Leader of the Opposition. His approach to leadership and parliamentary tactics was more congenial than usual; this led to both praise from those who saw him as a 'nice guy' and criticism from those who believed his style was ineffective compared to the so-called "media savvy and aggressive" parliamentary tactics of the Rann Labor government.

At the 2006 election the Liberals were soundly defeated, suffering a statewide swing against them of about 7.7 percent. Following that loss, Kerin stood down as Liberal leader, but remained in parliament. He was succeeded as Liberal leader by Iain Evans.

To date, Kerin is the last former head of a main government in Australia to have served as leader of the opposition.

Parliamentary resignation
In 2007, Kerin announced he would not be seeking re-election at the 2010 election. Kerin announced on 11 November 2008 that he would resign from parliament immediately rather than at the next election. This triggered the 2009 Frome by-election. Independent Geoff Brock won the seat in a very close contest, with his presence to later deny the Liberals government at the 2014 election.

References

External links

 

|-

|-

|-

|-

Premiers of South Australia
Members of the South Australian House of Assembly
Liberal Party of Australia members of the Parliament of South Australia
Deputy Premiers of South Australia
1954 births
Living people
Leaders of the Opposition in South Australia
21st-century Australian politicians
People educated at Sacred Heart College, Adelaide